The crab claw sail is a fore-and-aft triangular sail with spars along upper and lower edges. The crab claw sail was first developed by the Austronesian peoples by at least 2000 BCE. It is used in many traditional Austronesian cultures in Island Southeast Asia, Micronesia, Island Melanesia, Polynesia, and Madagascar. Due to its extraordinary performance and ease of operation, it has also become very popular in modern sport sailing. It is sometimes known as the Oceanic lateen or the Oceanic sprit, even though it is not restricted to Oceania, is neither a lateen sail nor a spritsail, and has an independent older origin.

History
Crab-claw sails were invented by the Austronesians somewhere in Island Southeast Asia by at least 2000 BCE. It was derived from a more ancient mast-less V-shaped square rig consisting simply of a square or triangular sail on two spars perpendicular to the hull converging at the base. It spread with the Austronesian migration to Micronesia, Island Melanesia, Madagascar, and Polynesia. It may have also caused the unique development of outrigger boat technology due to the necessity for stability once crab claw sails were attached to small watercraft. Crab claw sails can be used for double-canoe (catamaran), single-outrigger (on the windward side), or double-outrigger boat configurations, in addition to monohulls.

Crab claw sails are rigged fore-and-aft and can be tilted and rotated relative to the wind. They evolved from "V"-shaped perpendicular square sails (a "double sprit") in which the two spars converge at the base of the hull. The simplest form of the crab claw sail (also with the widest distribution) is composed of a triangular sail supported by two light spars (sometimes erroneously called "sprits") on each side. They were originally mastless, and the entire assembly was taken down when the sails were lowered. There are several distinct types of crab claw rigs, but unlike western rigs, they do not have fixed conventional names.

The need to propel larger and more heavily laden boats led to the increase in vertical sail. However this introduced more instability to the vessels. In addition to the unique invention of outriggers to solve this, the sails were also leaned backwards and the converging point moved further forward on the hull. This new configuration required a loose "prop" in the middle of the hull to hold the spars up, as well as rope supports on the windward side. This allowed more sail area (and thus more power) while keeping the center of effort low and thus making the boats more stable. The prop was later converted into fixed or removable canted masts where the spars of the sails were actually suspended by a halyard from the masthead. This type of sail is most refined in Micronesian proas which could reach very high speeds. These configurations are sometimes known as the "crane sprit" or the "crane spritsail". Micronesian, Island Melanesian, and Polynesian single-outrigger vessels also used this canted mast configuration to uniquely develop shunting, where canoes are symmetrical from front to back and change end-to-end when sailing against the wind.

The conversion of the prop to a fixed mast led to the much later invention of the tanja sail (also known variously and misleadingly as the canted square sail, canted rectangular sail, boomed lugsail, or balance lugsail). Tanja sails were rigged similarly to crab claw sails and also had spars on both the head and the foot of the sails; but they were square or rectangular with the spars not converging into a point.

Another evolution of the basic crab claw sail is the conversion of the upper spar into a fixed mast. In Polynesia, this gave the sail more height while also making it narrower, giving it a shape reminiscent of crab pincers (hence "crab claw" sail). This was also usually accompanied by the lower spar becoming more curved.

Austronesians traditionally made their sails from woven mats of the resilient and salt-resistant pandanus leaves. These sails allowed Austronesians to embark on long-distance voyaging. In some cases, however, they were one-way voyages. The failure of pandanus to establish populations in Easter Island and New Zealand is believed to have isolated their settlements from the rest of Polynesia.

Because of the crab claw sail's more ancient origin, there is also a hypothesis that contact between Arabs and Austronesians in their Indian Ocean voyages may have influenced the development of the triangular Arabic lateen sail; and in return Arab square-shaped sails may have influenced the development of the Austronesian rectangular tanja sail of western Southeast Asia. Others, however, believe that the tanja sail was an indigenous invention of Southeast Asian Austronesians, though they also believe that the lateen sail may have been introduced to Arab sailors via contact with Austronesian crab claw sails. A third theory however, concludes that lateen sails were originally Mediterranean and that Portuguese sailors introduced the lateen sail to Asian waters, starting with Vasco da Gama's arrival in India in 1500. This means that the development of lateen sails in western sailors were not influenced by the crab claw sail.

In western Indonesia, the crab claw sail reappeared as a recent development. Traditionally the people from western Indonesian islands had shifted to the tanja sail, but starting in the 19th century the Madurese people developed the lete sail. "Lete" actually means lateen, but the existence of pekaki (lower spar/boom) indicates that the layar lete is crab claw sail.

Construction

The crab claw sail consists of a sail, approximately an isosceles triangle in shape.  The equal length sides are usually longer than the third side, with spars along the long sides. Austronesian sails typically have spars along two edges of the sail. This is to distribute the loads of sheets and other point loads on the sail. The traditional and historic mat sails used for Austranesian sails has no reinforcement of the sail material along the edges. Since mat sails are not as strong as other sail materials, such as canvas, it is important that the spars provide the necessary reinforcement of the edges.

The crab claw may also traditionally be constructed with curved spars, giving the edges of the sail along the spars a convex shape, while the leech of the sail is often quite concave to keep it stiff on the trailing edge.  These features give it its distinct, claw-like shape.  Modern crab claws generally have straighter spars and a less convex leech, which gives more sail area for a given length of spar. Spars may taper towards the leech. The structure helps the sail to spill gusts.

The crab claw characteristically widens upwards, putting more sail area higher above the ocean, where the wind is stronger and steadier. This increases the heeling moment: the sails tend to blow the watercraft over. For this reason, crab claws are typically used on multihulls, which resist heeling more strongly.

The sail is shunted; the bow becomes the stern, and the mast rake is also reversed. The vessel therefore always has the ama (and sidestay, if there is one) to windward, and has no bad tack.

Proa
In a proa, the forward intersection of the spars is placed towards the bow.  The sail is supported by a short mast attached near the middle of the upper spar, and the forward corner is attached to the hull. The lower spar, or boom, is attached at the forward intersection, but is not attached to the mast. The proa has a permanent windward and leeward side, and exchanges one end for the other when coming about.

To tack, or switch directions across the wind, the forward corner of the sail is loosened and then transferred to the opposite end of the boat, a process called shunting. To shunt, the proa's sheet is let out. The joined corner of the spars is then transferred to the opposite end of the boat.  While remaining attached to the top of the mast, the upper spar tilts to vertical and beyond as the forward corner moves past the mast and onward to the other end of the boat.  Meanwhile, the mainsheet is detached and used to rotate the rearward end of the boom through a horizontal half circle. The spar join is then re-attached at the new "forward" end of the boat and the mainsheet is re-tightened at the new "rearward" end.

Tepukei 

A shunting rig with the sail propped vertically at the bow, very similar to the proa rig described above.

Non-shunting crab claw

The term "crab claw sail" is also used for non-shunting sails that widen upwards. The 'ōpe'a, the upper spar, is braced up so high that it is nearly parallel to the mast (as in a gunter rig). The paepae, the lower spar/boom, points well above the horizontal, unlike the boom of most gunter rigs and gaff rigs. The two spars can be brought together or pulled apart with control lines. The mast is fixed and stayed.

Performance
The crab claw sail is something of an enigma. It has been demonstrated to produce very large amounts of lift when reaching, and overall seems superior to any other simple sail plan (this discounts the use of specialised sails such as spinnakers). C. A. Marchaj, a researcher who has experimented extensively with both modern rigs for racing sailboats and traditional sailing rigs from around the world, has done wind tunnel testing of scale models of crab claw rigs. One popular but disputed theory is that the crab claw wing works like a delta wing, generating vortex lift. Since the crab claw does not lie symmetrically to the airflow, like an aircraft delta wing, but rather lies with the lower spar nearly parallel to the water, the airflow is not symmetrical. However, the presence of the water, close to the lower spar and parallel to it, makes the airflow behave roughly like the airflow over half of a delta wing, as though a "reflection" in the water provided the other half (apart from a narrow gap near the water, which causes a small difference there).
	 
This can clearly be seen in Marchaj's wind tunnel photos published in Sail Performance: Techniques to Maximise Sail Power (1996). The vortex on the top spar of the sail is much larger, covering most of the sail area, while the lower vortex is very small and stays close to the spar. Marchaj attributes the large lifting power of the sail to lift generated by the vortices, while others attribute the power to a favourable mix of aspect ratio, camber and (lack of) twist at this point of sail.

A more modern academic wind tunnel study (2014) provided similar results, with the Santa Cruz Islands tepukei'''s crab claw sail configuration dominating measurements.

Gallery

See alsoHokule'a''
James Wharram's voyage on Lapita
Jangada
Junk rig
Outrigger canoe
Proa
Tanja sail
Tepukei

Related rigs
Gaff rig
Gunter rig
Lateen rig, modern crabclaw-like variants

Notes

References

External links
 Video "Hot Buoys" Self-Tacking Crab-Claw Trimaran
 Wind Tunnel results on effects of crabclaw sail orientation - apex position and consistent camber

Sailing rigs and rigging
Austronesian culture